The Iljinhoe (一進會; 일진회) was a nationwide organization in Korea formed on August 8, 1904. A Japanese record states the number of party members was about 800,000, but another survey record by the Japanese Resident-General of Korea in 1910 shows the number was about 90,000. After seeing the failure of Korea's isolationism, the party claimed that Korea could not develop capitalism on its own, and demanded a merger with the Japanese Empire. Song Byeong-jun (송병준), the leader of the group and a high-ranking official in the Korean government before the Japan-Korea Annexation Treaty actively pushed ahead the annexation and received a title of nobility from the Japanese government in 1920. The group was disbanded on September 26, 1910, a month after the Japan-Korea Annexation Treaty. He is considered a traitor in modern day Korea.  

In 2006, a South Korean presidential committee announced the names of 120 people suspected of collaborating with Japan during its annexation rule of Korea. The list included 27 members of Iljinhoe, all of whom allegedly took the lead in suppressing Korean troops and supporting Japan-Korea annexation. The people on the list will face investigation on suspicion of conducting traitorous pro-Japanese activities during the 1904-1919 period, although no prosecutions will take place as the people implicated have long since died.

See also
Chinilpa
Japan-Korea Annexation Treaty
Korea under Japanese rule

References

External links
The Statement On The Annexation By Iljinhoe: The statement concerning Japanese annexation of Korea (Wikisource - Chinese and Japanese text）

Korean Empire
Korean collaborators with Imperial Japan
Organizations established in 1904
Organizations disestablished in 1910
1904 establishments in Asia